The Winston-Salem Northern Beltway is an under construction freeway loop around the North Carolinian city of Winston-Salem. The western section has been designated as North Carolina Highway 452 (NC 452), which will later become Interstate 274 (I-274) when completed, and the eastern section of the beltway will be designated as North Carolina Highway 74 (NC 74), which will later become part of I-74 when completed.

The beltway would make Winston-Salem the seventh city in North Carolina to have a full or partial Interstate loop; the other six are Asheville (I-240), Charlotte (I-485 and I-277), Raleigh (I-440 and I-540), Wilmington (I-140), Greensboro (I-840), and Fayetteville (I-295).

Route description
It would be entirely within Forsyth County and would cross I-40 and US 421 twice. The beltway would serve as a freeway connector for the suburban communities of Walkertown, Stanleyville, Rural Hall, Tobaccoville, Pfafftown, Lewisville, and Clemmons and would serve as a possible bypass for US 158 and US 52. The TIP Project Number is R-2247 for the western segment and U-2579 for the under construction eastern segment.

As of November 2022, the completed portion is signed as NC 74, and bears the mile markers based on I-74's putative mileage when the interstate is completed.  Starting at the current western terminus at mile marker 42 (NC 66) near Rural Hall, the route travels southeast, with interchanges at NC 8/Germanton Road (Exit 43), Baux Mountain Road (Exit 45), US 311/New Walkertown Road (Exit 49), and US 158 (Reidsville Road).  The road turns gently to a more southerly route, and reaches its current terminus at US 421/Salem Parkway near Kernersville.  As of November, 2022 work is underway to extend the route in both directions, reaching west to US 52 at the northwestern end by late 2023/early 2024 and south to meet the current I-40 and I-74 by 2025/2026.

History
Construction of the western segment of the beltway was to begin in 1999 but was delayed by a lawsuit aimed at the environmental impact statement (EIS). After the legal situation was resolved, the North Carolina Department of Transportation (NCDOT) then announced construction would begin in 2006; however, in March 2005, the department postponed the start date again until at least 2012 due to budget shortfalls. Funds once allocated to the western segment were then reapportioned to the construction of the eastern segment, which had a planned construction start date in 2011.

A second lawsuit, however, delayed the road further. A federal district judge in May 2010 dismissed the cases accusing an updated environmental study of ignoring global warming and impact on other intersecting roads. However, the high cost of building the entire project pushed the beltway to last place on a list of urban loop projects being built by the state. In March 2011, state officials agreed to rank projects using sections, which might help the eastern section move higher on a list by 2014.

On September 7, 2011, North Carolina Governor Bev Perdue announced that construction of a part of the eastern leg of the beltway would begin in 2014. The section to be built connects US 158 to I-40 Business (I-40 Bus.; now US 421/Salem Parkway). Right-of-way acquisition began in 2012 and cost $34 million (equivalent to $ in ); construction was estimated to cost $156 million. Construction on the segment, Project U-2579B, commenced in December 2014, with an anticipated completion date of November 2018. However, after delays, including an opening date of late 2019, it was finally opened to traffic on September 5, 2020.

Since then, funding has been allocated to complete the remaining sections of NC 74 between US 52 and the current I-74 (formerly cosigned with US 311), starting with the segment between US 311 and US 158, known as Project U-2579C, in October 2017. Construction on this segment began in 2018, was scheduled to open in 2021, and opened to traffic on December 23, 2020.

That same year, a contract for the segment between NC 66 and US 311, Projects U-2579D, U-2579E, and U-2579F, was awarded. Construction on this segment begun in April 2019, and it opened to traffic on November 7, 2022. Next, construction on the segments between I-74 and I-40 Bus. (now US 421/Salem Parkway), Projects U-2579AA and U-2579AB, are scheduled to begin in 2020 and will open in 2024. Construction on the interchange with US 52, which began in 2019, is scheduled to be completed in 2022.

On January 22, 2022, another contract was awarded. The last section of the eastern leg (I-40 to the existing I-74) is scheduled to begin in October 2022. Both of these projects apparently had to be postponed due to the cash crunch caused by the COVID-19 pandemic.

The first phase of the project to be constructed was the northeastern quadrant, starting at US 421 (Salem Parkway) and extending north and west.  It was completed in four segments.  The first segment, from US 421 to US 158, was completed on September 5, 2020.  The second segment, extending the route to US 311, was opened on December 23, 2020.  The third segment, to NC 66, was completed on November 7, 2022.

Future 
A "Southern Beltway" connecting the eastern and western segments in Forsyth County and northern Davidson County is in the initial planning stages, as its general proposed routing appears on some Winston-Salem Department of Transportation (WSDOT) long-range planning maps. , no preferred alternatives for this southern section have been officially submitted, and NCDOT does not include the Southern Beltway on its vision maps. The WSDOT plans for this final section of the beltway to start construction sometime after 2030. If completed as planned, the Southern Beltway would serve as a connector for the communities of Midway, Wallburg, and Arcadia and would not necessarily be utilized as a bypass for I-40 due to the freeway's southward dip. Once the northern segments of the loop are completed, I-40 through Winston-Salem would technically complete the beltway loop without the southern section.

Exit list

Interstate 274

Interstate 274 (I-274) is the future designation for the western half of the beltway, currently designated as NC 452. When completed, it will connect US 158, near Clemmons, to Future I-74/Future I-285/US 52, in Bethania. I-274 first appeared on NCDOT planning maps in the early 2000s but was later disused for over a decade since. On May 20, 2019, the American Association of State Highway and Transportation Officials (AASHTO) approved a request to establish Future I-274. Justification given by NCDOT was that the  section would satisfy a great need to alleviate congestion in Winston-Salem and connect the western portion of the urbanized area.

See also

 Greensboro Urban Loop

References

External links

NCDOT - Winston-Salem Northern Beltway official site

Freeways in North Carolina
Beltways in the United States
Proposed state highways in the United States
74-2
Interstate 74
74-2 North Carolina
Transportation in Winston-Salem, North Carolina
Transportation in Forsyth County, North Carolina